Yingao Road is a metro station on Line 18 of the Shanghai Metro. Located at the intersection of Yingao Road and North Guoquan Road along the boundary of Baoshan District with Yangpu District in the city of Shanghai, the station was opened with the rest of phase one of Line 18 on December 30, 2021. During the planning stage of Line 18, the station was known as North Guoquan Road.

References 

Railway stations in Shanghai
Shanghai Metro stations in Baoshan District
Shanghai Metro stations in Yangpu District
Line 18, Shanghai Metro
Railway stations in China opened in 2021